Mathias Flückiger (born 27 September 1988) is a Swiss mountain bike racer. He rode at the cross-country event at the 2016 Summer Olympics, and 2020 Summer Olympics, where he won a silver medal. His brother Lukas is also a cyclist. In 2022 he was suspended for doping.

Major results

2008
 3rd  Cross-country, UEC European Under-23 Championships
2010
 1st  Cross-country, UCI World Under-23 Championships
 1st  Cross-country, UEC European Under-23 Championships
2012
 3rd  Cross-country, UCI World Championships
 3rd Cross-country, National Championships
2014
 1st  Overall Swiss Epic (with Lukas Buchli)
2015
 1st  Overall Swiss Epic (with Lukas Buchli)
2017
 2nd Cross-country, National Championships
2018
 1st  Cross-country, National Championships
 6th Overall UCI XCO World Cup
1st Mont-Sainte-Anne
2019
 UCI XCO World Cup
1st Albstadt
3rd Nové Město
 2nd  Cross-country, UCI World Championships
 2nd Cross-country, National Championships
2020
 2nd  Cross-country, UCI World Championships
 Swiss Bike Cup
1st Gstaad
2nd Leukerbad
2021
 1st  Cross-country, National Championships
 1st  Overall UCI XCO World Cup
1st Leogang
1st Les Gets
3rd Albstadt
3rd Nové Město
 UCI XCC World Cup
1st Leogang
1st Les Gets
2nd Lenzerheide
 2nd  Cross-country, Olympic Games
 2nd  Cross-country, UCI World Championships
2022
 1st  Cross-country, National Championships
 UCI XCO World Cup
1st Leogang
 UCI XCC World Cup
1st Leogang
1st Vallnord
2nd Lenzerheide

References

External links

1988 births
Living people
Swiss male cyclists
Cyclists at the 2016 Summer Olympics
Cyclists at the 2020 Summer Olympics
Olympic cyclists of Switzerland
Swiss mountain bikers
Medalists at the 2020 Summer Olympics
Olympic silver medalists for Switzerland
Olympic medalists in cycling
Cyclists from Bern